Albert Andersson may refer to:

Albert Andersson (missionary) (1865–1915), Swedish missionary to China
Albert Andersson (athlete) (1902–1977), Swedish athlete and gymnast
Albert Andersson (politician) (1878–1962), Swedish politician

See also
Albert Anderson (disambiguation)